The 1979–80 Fort Lauderdale Strikers season was the first season of the new team in the new North American Soccer League indoor league.  It was part of the club's thirteenth season in professional soccer.  This year the team finished in fourth place of the Eastern Division and did not make the playoffs.

Background

Review

Competitions

NASL indoor regular season 

W = Wins, L = Losses, GB = Games Behind 1st Place, % = Winning Percentage, GF = Goals For, GA = Goals Against, Av Att = Average Home Attendance

Results summaries

Results by round

Match reports

NASL indoor playoffs 
did not qualify

Statistics

Transfers

References 

Fort Lauderdale Strikers (1977–1983) seasons
Fort Lauderdale Strikers
Fort Lauderdale Strikers indoor
Fort Lauderdale Strikers indoor
Fort Lauderdale Strikers